

Islam is the fastest-growing major religion in Europe, primarily due to immigration and higher fertility rates among Muslims. Since the 1960s, immigrants from Muslim countries started to appear in numbers in Western Europe, especially in Germany, France and Belgium. Although large Muslim communities have existed on the continent since Ottoman conquests in the late Middle Ages, especially in the Balkans, this was the first major wave of immigration of Muslims to northwestern Europe.

Muslims in Europe are not a homogeneous group. They are of various national, ethnic and racial identities. The top regions of origin of Muslims in Western Europe are Turkey, the Maghreb (including Morocco, Tunisia and Algeria), and South Asia (including Pakistan and Afghanistan).

In Western Europe, Muslims generally live in major urban areas, often concentrated in neighborhoods of large cities.

According to the Pew Research Center, as of 2016 the total number of Muslims in Europe is roughly 4.9%. The total number of Muslims in the European Union in 2010 was about 19 million (3.8%). The French capital of Paris and its metropolitan area has the largest number (1.7 million in 2008 according to The Economist) of Muslims out of any city in the European Union.

By 2030, people of Muslim faith or origin are predicted to form about 8% of the population of Europe.

The table below lists large cities of the European Union with significant Muslim populations, some estimating the percentage of Muslims by using the percentage of Asians in those cities.

See also
Islam in Europe
Islam in Austria
Islam in Belgium
Islam in Denmark
Islam in France
Islam in Germany
Islam in Ireland
Islam in Italy
Islam in the Netherlands
Islam in Spain
Islam in Sweden
Islam in Finland

References

External links
The numbers of French Muslims and Muslims in France are exaggerated
On exagère délibérément le nombre de musulmans en France on Le Nouvel Observateur

Cities
Muslim population
European Union by Muslim population
Religious demographics
Demographics of Europe
Geography of the European Union
European Union society
European Union-related lists
Islam-related lists